Government Debendra College is a public college in Manikganj, Manikganj District, Dhaka Division, Bangladesh. It offers bachelor's degrees and master's degrees. It also has a Higher Secondary Certificate (HSC) program. It is affiliated with Bangladesh National University. As of 2015, the principal is Syed Ikbal Moiz and the vice principal is Sirajul Islam.

History 
In 1944, the college was renamed Debendra College after the name of the father name of Ranadaprasad Saha of Mirzapur, Tangail District. The degree courses were introduced in the college in 1947. It opened a science section in the higher secondary level in 1963 and commerce at the degree level in 1964. BSC courses were introduced in the college in 1970 and Honours courses in Bangla language and literature in 1971. The college started courses in agricultural science at the intermediate level in 1976. It was nationalised on 1 March 1980. Since 1989, the college has been offering Honours programmes in political science and accounting and masters programmes in economics, philosophy, history, management and mathematics.

Facilities 
Government Debendra College has five academic buildings and three student dormitories: two hostels for women and another for men. There is a playing ground in front of the college. There are two ponds, one on the east side of the college and another on the west side. There is one mosque, beside the playing ground. There is one shahid minar.

Academics 
Government Debendra College offers HSC, four years Honours and two year masters course in various majors. The college is affiliated with the National University. As of 2015, the college has more than 16,000 students and 94 teachers. Many students participate in politics.

Notable residents
 Khandkar Manwar Hossain, statistician, educator, researcher.
 Mohammad Ali Reza Khan, Bengal Presidency, British India.
 Mohammad Kaykobad
 Ranadaprasad Saha, businessman
 Muhammad Siddiq Khan, Principal
 Dr. Sadique Swapon

References

External links 

Educational institutions established in 1942
1942 establishments in India
Colleges in Manikganj District